The Australian Sprintcar Championship is a dirt track racing championship held each year to determine the Australian national champion for winged sprint car racing. The single championship meeting runs in either late January or early February and has been held each year since the Windsor RSL Speedway in Sydney hosted the first championship in 1963. After the first nine championship meetings were held in New South Wales, the Sprintcar Control Council of Australia (SCCA) now holds the meeting in a different state on a rotational basis, with 1972 seeing the first championship held outside of NSW at the Premier Speedway in Warrnambool, Victoria. The Australian Sprintcar Title is only open to Australian drivers and is run and sanctioned by the SCCA.

Because it is restricted to Australian drivers only, the race has a lot prestige for local drivers to become their country's National Champion.

History
The championship has gone by different names over its 52 years as in that time Sprintcars have evolved from crude modified 'hot rods' to the dual winged, 410 cubic inch engined cars of today. The majority of race cars and engines are imported from the US, although some local chassis builders still exist. Sprintcars themselves are modular, with many combinations of chassis and engine possible. Equipment is highly specialised. Wheels, suspension, wings, drive train and fuel tank all bolt to a chassis.

From 1963 to 1964 the title was known as the Australian Sportsman Hot rod Championship. In 1965 this changed to the Australian Hot Rod Championship. This was again changed in 1966 to the National Super Modified Championship but the 1965 name re-appeared in 1967. From 1968 to 1970 the meeting was known as the Australian Super Modified Championship while from 1971 to 1978 the title was then called the Australian Modified Sprintcar Championship before changing one more time in 1979 to its current name, the Australian Sprintcar Championship.

The Australian championship, along with the Grand Annual Sprintcar Classic held exclusively at Warrnambool's Premier Speedway, are seen the two most prestigious single Sprintcar meetings on the Australian speedway calendar. Another prestigious race is the Australian Sprintcar Grand Prix held annually at the Sydney Speedway.

The championship is separate to Australia's national Sprintcar series, the World Series Sprintcars which has been running since 1987.  Unique restrictions apply to the Australian Championship.  Only Australian residents and citizens are eligible to participate; foreign drivers are not eligible to participate in this event.

Retired Sydney based driver Garry Rush holds the record with ten Australian championship wins and 18 podium finishes between 1966 and 1998. New South Wales based drivers have dominated the title with 36 wins from 52 championships. Six drivers were from Victoria, three each from South Australia and Western Australia, two winners have been from Queensland, and one from Tasmania.

While many successful Australian Sprintcar drivers started out racing Speedcars, only three drivers have ever won both the Australian Sprintcar Championship and the Australian Speedcar Championship. They being Sydney drivers George Tatnell and Robert Farr, and Adelaide's Phil March. Victorian driver Max Dumesny, who won the championship in 1991, 1998 and 2002, was also the Australian Formula 500 Champion in 1981 and 1983, and is the only driver to achieve the Formula 500-Sprintcar double. Dumesny is also the son-in-law of former racer Sid Moore, having married Moore's daughter, Melinda, herself a former Sprintcar driver, in 1992.

On 25–28 January 2012 Speedway City in Adelaide hosted the 50th Anniversary Australian Sprintcar Championship. Sydney driver Brooke Tatnell won his 5th Australian championship and repeated the feat of his late father George Tatnell who won his only Australian Sprintcar Title at the track in 1988 (the 1988 meeting was also the younger Tatnell's first appearance in the championship at just 16 years of age). George and Brooke Tatnell are one of only two father-son combinations to win the championship, the other being Sydney's Steve and Garry Brazier

The 2014 Australian Champion was former Tasmanian driver David Murcott who won his first national championship after finishing third in 2012 and second in 2013. The 2014 championship was held at the Latrobe Speedway in Latrobe, Tasmania. Murcott, who is based in Victoria, became the first Tasmanian driver to win the Australian Sprintcar Championship.

The 2015-16 Australian championship was held at the Premier Speedway in Warrnambool, Victoria on 29–31 January 2016. Sydney's Kerry Madsen won his second Australian title (having won his first also in Warrnambool in 2003) from Brooke Tatnell with Jamie Veal finishing 3rd.

Winners since 1963

 There were two races in 1986.  The first was for the 1985–86 season, held in January.  The second was for the 1986–87 season since the Australian Sprintcar Championship was held at Northline Speedway on the grounds of Hidden Valley Raceway in Darwin, and held early to avoid the October–April wet season. The 1988 race was for the 1987–88 season.  The Australian sprint car racing season is technically 1 July–June 30.

Australian 360 Sprintcar Championship
Since the early 2000s, Sprintcar racing in Australia has seen a shift into two divisions. This is down to the different cubic capacity of the engines used. The top division runs 410 cui (6.7 Litre) engines while those who use the smaller 360 cui (6.0 Litre) engines race in their own division. While the two divisions mix at regular track meetings, the 360 Sprintcars have their own state and national championships. Robbie Farr and Jamie Veal are the only drivers to have won both the open and 360 Championships, Farr having won the open championship in 2004 and the 360 championship in 2013 and Veal the 360 championship in 2017 and the open championship in 2020.

The current (2017) Australian Champion is Victoria's Jamie Veal who won the title at the Perth Motorplex in Perth, Western Australia.

Winners since 2004

See also

Motorsport in Australia

References

External links
Official SCCA Australian Sprintcar Championship Honour Roll

Sprintcar
Sprintcar
Sprintcar
Sprint car racing